Knut Yrvin (born March 7, 1967) is a Norwegian software developer. He was an important contributor to the initiation of the Skolelinux project (now DebianEdu). He is also one of the board members of Electronic Frontier Norway, a Norwegian version of Electronic Frontier Foundation.

He has always been one of the most known fighters for free software in Norway and in 1984 won a Norwegian championship in Break  Dance.

He also took part in Norske Talenter 2010, where he qualified to the final, but did not win.

See also 
 Trolltech
 Debian
 Popping

References

External links 

 skolelinux.org
 Knut Yrvin doing the Electric boogie on Norway Got Talent (Norske talenter) (edited version, as broadcast on TV 2)
 Knut Yrvin doing the Electric boogie with the national radiostation P4 at Karl Johan in Oslo

Norwegian computer scientists
Living people
1967 births